Old Goat Mountain is a  mountain summit located in Kananaskis Country of Alberta, Canada.

Description

Old Goat Mountain is situated  near the south end of the Goat Range which is a subrange of the Canadian Rockies, and is the highest point in the Goat Range. The east flank of the mountain is within Spray Valley Provincial Park, whereas the west aspect is within Banff National Park, with the boundary line between the two parks running roughly north-to-south over its summit. Precipitation runoff from the mountain drains to the Spray Lakes Reservoir. Topographic relief is significant as the summit rises over 1,400 meters (4,600 feet) above Spray Lake in three kilometers (1.86 mile). The nearest higher peak is Wind Mountain,  to the east. Old Goat Mountain can be seen from Alberta Highway 742, the Smith-Dorrien/Spray Trail.

History
The mountain was named "Old Goat" in memory of Rick Collier, a founding member of the Old Goats Climbing Club, who had climbed this peak numerous times and had written much about it. Collier died in a 2012 mountaineering accident, so the mountain's name has not yet been officially adopted.

Geology
Old Goat Mountain is composed of sedimentary rock laid down during the Precambrian to Jurassic periods. Formed in shallow seas, this sedimentary rock was pushed east and over the top of younger rock during the Laramide orogeny.

Climate
Based on the Köppen climate classification, Old Goat Mountain is located in a subarctic climate zone with cold, snowy winters, and mild summers. Winter temperatures can drop below  with wind chill factors below .

See also
 Scrambles in the Canadian Rockies

Gallery

References

External links
Weather forecast for Old Goat Mountain Mountain Forecast
Spray Valley Provincial Park Alberta Parks
Banff National Park National Park Service
Rick Collier Bivouac

Three-thousanders of Alberta
Canadian Rockies
Alberta's Rockies
Mountains of Banff National Park